Tsukumo may refer to:

Academy Award nominated short within the 2013 film Short Peace
Tsukumo Station, train station located in Kurihara, Miyagi Prefecture, Japan. 
Hiroko Tsukumo (born 1970), retired Japanese volleyball player
Tsukumo Happy Soul, Japanese manga written and drawn by Kendi Oiwa
Yuma's family within the Yu-Gi-Oh! Zexal anime series

See also
Tsukumogami

Japanese-language surnames